Joseph or Joe Duncan may refer to:

Joseph Duncan (politician) (1794–1844), sixth Governor of the state of Illinois (1834–1838)
Joseph Alfred Duncan (born 1993), Ghanaian footballer
Joseph Edward Duncan (1963–2021), American convicted serial killer and child molester
Joseph Forbes Duncan (1879–1964), Scottish trade unionist and politician
Joe Duncan (baseball), American baseball player
Joe Don Duncan (born 1990), American football player